Lake Turkana National Parks is a group of three national parks located around Lake Turkana in Kenya. It was inscribed as a UNESCO World Heritage Site  in 1997 and expanded in 2001. Reasons for the park's importance include its use as a stopping point for migratory birds, as a breeding ground for the Nile crocodile, hippopotamus, and snakes. It also contains fossils in the Koobi Fora deposits which are unique in the world.
Lake Turkana National Parks consist of Sibiloi National Park and two islands on Lake Turkana (Central Island and South Island).

Gallery

External links
 UNESCO Fact Sheet

Lake Turkana
Masai xeric grasslands and shrublands
World Heritage Sites in Kenya
National parks of Kenya